Ehab Galal is an Egyptian former football player and manager, who was most recently in charge of Pharco FC in the Egyptian Premier League.

Managerial career
Galal was the manager of El Makkasa for three seasons of 2014–2017, he also used to manage Enppi and Zamalek clubs during the 2017–18 Egyptian Premier League season. In 2018, he managed El Masry until 2020, then he had coached El Makkasa for six months in the same year.

On 12 April 2022, it was announced that Galal was going to be the Egyptian national team manager after Carlos Queiroz's departure. On 16 June 2022, he was sacked from his position after three games in charge.

On 17 December 2022, he became the head coach of Pharco FC. However, he resigned after only eight games on 24 January 2023.

Managerial statistics

References

External links
 

1967 births
Living people
Association football defenders
Egyptian footballers
Egypt international footballers
Egyptian football managers
ENPPI SC managers
Zamalek SC managers
Al Masry SC managers
Ismaily SC managers
Egyptian Premier League players
Ismaily SC players
Expatriate football managers in Libya
Egypt national football team managers